Mikhail Aleksandrovich Komkov (born 1 October 1984) is a Russian professional footballer. He plays as a wide midfielder for FC Yenisey-2 Krasnoyarsk.

Club career
He made his professional debut in the Russian First Division in 2002 for FC Metallurg Krasnoyarsk.

He made his Russian Premier League debut for FC Krasnodar on 19 March 2011 in a game against PFC Spartak Nalchik.

References

1984 births
Sportspeople from Krasnoyarsk
Living people
Russian footballers
FC KAMAZ Naberezhnye Chelny players
FC Krasnodar players
FC Kuban Krasnodar players
Russian Premier League players
FC Khimki players
FC Tom Tomsk players
FC Anzhi Makhachkala players
FC Tosno players
FC Yenisey Krasnoyarsk players
Association football midfielders